Captain Owen Stanley FRS RN (13 June 1811 – 13 March 1850) was a British Royal Navy officer and surveyor.

Life

Stanley was born in Alderley, Cheshire, the son of Edward Stanley, rector of Alderley and later Bishop of Norwich. A brother was Arthur Penrhyn Stanley and his sister Mary Stanley.

He entered the Royal Naval College at the age of fifteen and remained there in 1824–1826, but these dates are inconsistent. For a few months in 1826, he served as a volunteer on board the Royal Navy's  which was then in the English Channel. After gaining the rank of midshipman in 1826, in 1826–1827, he spent time about South America on board . In 1827–1830, he was on the Royal Navy's . And then in 1830, he was with Phillip Parker King on board HMS Adventure while it surveyed the Straits of Magellan at the tip of South America.

By 1830, the 1821–1829 Greek War of Independence had ended and the United Kingdom found itself in a 'peace keeping' role about Greece in the Mediterranean once the fighting stopped. Owen Stanley found himself in the middle of these efforts. By 1831, he served as mate on board the Royal Navy's  and then with Captain John Franklin on  both in the Mediterranean in 1831.

In 1831, he received promotion to lieutenant and continued to serve in Grecian waters until 1836 on a number of ships.

In 1836, with his Mediterranean service now over, he sailed to the Arctic as scientific officer on  under George Back. While on the 'high seas' two things of some note happened to him: on 26 March 1839, he was promoted to commander; and, in March 1842, he was elected a Fellow of the Royal Society.

In 1843–1846 he was assigned shore duty. During that time, on 23 September 1844, he was promoted to captain at the age of 33.

In November 1847 he arrived at Port Curtis on the Australian coast, and after surveying the harbour described it as a very good anchorage. In 1848 he continued further north to survey New Guinea, and in June of that year offered protection and assistance to Edmund Kennedy's expedition to the Cape York Peninsula. Owen went on to survey the Louisiade Archipelago but in 1849 fell ill, and died in March 1850 after returning to Sydney.

John MacGillivray wrote a two-volume account of the voyage of the Rattlesnake, published in 1852. 
Thomas Huxley wrote a  diary of the voyage which was published in 1935, edited by his grandson Julian Huxley.

In memory of his brother, Dean Stanley of Westminster Abbey donated the font in ChristChurch Cathedral in New Zealand.

Legacy
The Owen Stanley Range in New Guinea is named after him.

See also
 
 European and American voyages of scientific exploration

References

Huxley, Julian (ed). T.H. Huxley's diary of the voyage of HMS Rattlesnake. London 1935

 MacGillivray, John Voyage Of HMS Rattlesnake
Volume I: Gutenberg Project EText num 12433,  
Volume II: Gutenberg Project EText num 12525,

External links 
 
Stanley, Owen (1811–1850) National Library of Australia, Trove, People and Organisation record for Owen Stanley

1811 births
1850 deaths
People from Alderley Edge
Royal Navy officers
English explorers
English hydrographers
Explorers of New Guinea
19th-century explorers
Fellows of the Royal Society
Owen
Pre-Separation Queensland
English explorers of the Pacific